Paraphidippus fartilis is a species of jumping spider.

Range  
It has a range from Texas, through Baja California Sur and southern Mexico down to Panama.

References 

Salticidae
Spiders of North America
Spiders described in 1888